Philip Yousef Elhage (born April 11, 1982) is a Curaçao born sport shooter who competes internationally for Aruba. Elhage represented the Netherlands Antilles at the 2008 Summer Olympics in Beijing, where he competed in the men's 10 m air pistol. He finished only in forty-sixth place by two points behind Turkey's Yusuf Dikeç from the fourth attempt, for a total score of 566 targets. Elhage represented Aruba at the 2020 Summer Olympics in Tokyo. He competed in the men's 10 metre air pistol qualification round on 24 July, where he shot 556 points resulting in 35th place and failing to qualify to the final.

References

External links
NBC Olympics Profile

1982 births
Living people
Dutch Antillean male sport shooters
Olympic shooters of the Netherlands Antilles
Shooters at the 2008 Summer Olympics
Shooters at the 2020 Summer Olympics
Curaçao sportsmen
People from Willemstad
Shooters at the 2019 Pan American Games
Pan American Games competitors for Aruba